Fremont is a ghost town in Clinton County, Illinois, United States.

References

Geography of Clinton County, Illinois
Ghost towns in Illinois